The 2023 Spokane mayoral election will be held on November 7, 2023 to elect the mayor of Spokane in the U.S. state of Washington. The election will be officially nonpartisan. Incumbent Republican mayor Nadine Woodward is running for re-election to a second term in office.

Candidates

Declared
Tim Archer, president of International Association of Fire Fighters Local 29
Lisa Brown, former director of the Washington State Department of Commerce, former Majority Leader of the Washington Senate, and runner-up for WA-05 in 2018 (Party affiliation: Democratic)
Deece Casillas, comedian
Keith Kleven
Nadine Woodward, incumbent mayor (Party affiliation: Republican)

Withdrew
Jonathan Regault, commercial real estate appraiser (Party affiliation: Green)

Potential
Marcus Riccelli, state representative (Party affiliation: Democratic)

Declined
Breean Beggs, president of the Spokane City Council
Natasha Hill, attorney and runner-up for WA-05 in 2022 (Party affiliation: Democratic)
Ben Stuckart, former president of the Spokane City Council and runner-up for mayor in 2019 (endorsed Brown)
Amber Waldref, Spokane County commissioner
Vanessa Waldref, U.S. Attorney for the Eastern District of Washington
Chud Wendle, businessman
Zack Zappone, city councilor

Endorsements

References

Spokane
Mayoral elections in Spokane, Washington
History of Spokane, Washington
Government of Spokane, Washington
Spokane